Burn FM (sometimes stylised as BurnFM.com, BurnFM, or BURN FM) is the official student radio station based at the University of Birmingham.  The original name was BurnFM.com. 'Burn' stands for 'Birmingham University Radio Network'. Burn FM also regularly review many songs and celebrities such as AJ Tracey, Eminem and NSG.

History
Founded in the 1960s as the University of Birmingham Radio Society by a small group of radio amateurs including G3OAD, G3PLS, G3PLP, G3LJR  and G3PJT, it was renamed as the University of Birmingham Amateur radio society (Radio Soc) between 1978 and 1996. The first record of the use of 'BURN FM' with regards to the radio society was in 1998.

The station was founded in this, its third incarnation, in Spring 1996 and, until October 2006, it broadcast twice a year on an FM, usually in October and March for 28 days each time. It is now a term time Webcasting organisation broadcasting most of the academic year.

Burn FM caters for a variety of musical tastes, and shows are particularly targeted at Selly Oak, where many students live. Specialist shows aim to provide distinctive playlists and fewer spoken features than mainstream shows which are partly playlisted by the station music team with the latest music and special specialist catering to more generic music tastes.

The studio is located at the University of Birmingham Guild of Students - on the main campus at Edgbaston, Birmingham. Broadcasts are from 9am daily, with transmissions ending at 11pm. Mainstream shows play out between 12pm and 6pm Monday through to Friday with evenings from 6pm. Weekend broadcasts begin at 10am and end at 11pm.

A planned broadcast was missed in Spring 2002 because of an administrative error. In 2008, broadcasting had to be postponed for two semesters because of a lack of air conditioning in the studio. The basement location of the studio means that it is close to the Guild of Students boiler, and so the studio and the Guild were at risk. In the summer of 2008, the studio underwent a major refurbishment in an attempt to avoid those complications recurring. In 2009, BurnFM was rebranded to BurnFM.com and went back on-air.

In August 2004, lightning struck the building, and damaged the transmission aerial. This resulted in damage, valued at £13 000, to the broadcast mixer and other equipment. An insurance payout resulted in a new studio being fitted for the Autumn 2005 broadcast. For the 2004-05 academic year, equipment had to be loaned.

It was during the Spring 2005 broadcast that BBC 6 Music came to Birmingham for a one-off, outside broadcast from the studio. The Phill Jupitus Breakfast Show on 11 March was presented from the Burn FM studio.

'Restricted Service Licences' - RSLs - last for 28 days, and only two can be held in one calendar year. This is stipulated by Ofcom.  Therefore, an internet licence has been granted by the University for the first time; this will allow the station to broadcast for the whole semester. Before this, internet broadcasting had been offered in conjunction with FM broadcasts - a simulcast - only.

Burn FM has enjoyed great success particularly in the field of sports journalism. The Burn FM Sports Team won six national awards between 2008 and 2014 for coverage of events such as the BUCS National Finals, BUCS Outdoor athletics Championships and National Karting Championships with many of their number going on to further careers in media including positions within the BBC and further study of broadcasting around the country. In January 2020, Burn FM covered the British National Track Championships at the National Cycling Centre for the first time.

The station is notable for being the launch pad for media outlet "Things Can Only Get Better".

Burn FM underwent a full station re-brand and website redesign in 2013-14. Another website redesign accompanied a full technical overhaul in Spring 2018, which included the installation of over £15,000 worth of new hardware and software in the Luscombe (main) Studio, the Selly (production) studio, and the server room.

Station Managers
Information correct as of November 2021.

Head of Sport 
Information correct as of November 2021.

Head of Music (Internal) 
Information correct as of March 2022.

Head of Music (External) 
Information correct as of March 2022.

Awards 
Information correct as of November 2020.

See also 
 Student radio
 Student Radio Association
 Redbrick (newspaper)
 University of Birmingham Guild of Students

References

External links
 Official Burn FM website

University of Birmingham
Radio stations in Birmingham, West Midlands
Radio stations established in 1996
Student radio in the United Kingdom